Olivia Mitchell (born 31 July 1947) is a former Irish Fine Gael politician who served as a Teachta Dála (TD) for the Dublin South constituency from 1997 to 2016.

Mitchell was born in Birr, County Offaly. She was educated at Dominican College on Eccles Street and at Trinity College Dublin, where she qualified with a Bachelor of Arts in Economics and Politics. She was an Economics teacher before entering politics. She first became involved in politics in 1985, when she was elected to Dún Laoghaire–Rathdown County Council. She was Cathaoirleach (Chair) of the council from 1995 to 1996. She served on the council until 2003. She was an unsuccessful candidate for Dublin South at the 1989 and 1992 general elections.

Mitchell was first elected to Dáil Éireann as a Fine Gael TD for the Dublin South constituency at the 1997 general election, and was re-elected at the 2002 general election with 5,568 first preferences. She increased this vote significantly at the 2007 general election, polling 9,037 first preferences.

In 2001, she received her first front bench position as Spokesperson for Housing and Local Government. She has also served as Opposition Spokesperson for Health and Children (2002–04). In Enda Kenny's reshuffle in 2004, she took on the Transport portfolio. From 2007 to 2010, she was Spokesperson for Arts, Sport and Tourism.

In June 2010, she supported Richard Bruton's leadership challenge to Enda Kenny. Following Kenny's victory in a motion of confidence, Mitchell was not re-appointed to the front bench. From October 2010 to March 2011, she was party deputy Spokesperson on Communications, Energy and Natural Resources with special responsibility for Competition and Consumer Protection.

In its final report, the Mahon Tribunal's investigation into planning corruption in the Dublin area found Mitchell to have received an inappropriate payment of £500 from Frank Dunlop at the time of the 1992 general election. The Mahon Report found that Mitchell had held meetings with Dunlop and Owen O'Callaghan in relation to the Quarryvale project, and was a supporter of the project. "While the evidence would suggest Cllr Mitchell did not solicit the contribution, she nonetheless accepted it in the knowledge of Mr Dunlop's close association with the project," the report found.

She did not contest the 2016 general election.

References

 

1947 births
Living people
Alumni of Trinity College Dublin
Councillors of Dublin County Council
Fine Gael TDs
Irish schoolteachers
Local councillors in Dún Laoghaire–Rathdown
Members of the 28th Dáil
Members of the 29th Dáil
Members of the 30th Dáil
Members of the 31st Dáil
20th-century women Teachtaí Dála
21st-century women Teachtaí Dála
Politicians from County Offaly